K.I. Singh is a Gaupalika(Nepali: गाउपालिका ; gaupalika) in Doti District in the Sudurpashchim Province of far-western Nepal. 
K.I. Singh has a population of 20903.The land area is 127.01 km2.

References

Rural municipalities in Doti District
Rural municipalities of Nepal established in 2017